Nur Dania Syuhada (born 11 September 2005) is a Malaysian cricketer. In January 2022, at the age of 16, she made her T20I debut against Bangladesh. 
In October 2022, she played a few T20Is against Test playing teams in Women's Asia Cup.

References

External links
 

2005 births
Living people
Malaysian women cricketers
Malaysia women Twenty20 International cricketers